Josh Graham, (born 1 October 1983 in Taree, New South Wales, Australia) is a former rugby union & rugby league footballer, having played for a number of clubs in Australia. He last played top-flight rugby for the Gold Coast Titans as 

Graham is considered a powerful ball-running lock or centre. Raised in Taree on the mid-North coast of NSW, Graham played rugby union for the First XV at The Southport School and has represented Australia at Schoolboy, Under 21 and Sevens level and had four games with the Queensland Reds before moving to rugby league and the Melbourne Storm.

In 2007 Graham returned to rugby league as an inaugural member of the Gold Coast Titans.

At the end of the 2010 NRL season, he was released from the Titans team and became the solar super salesman.

References

External links
Gold Coast Titans profile

See also
List of football converts

1983 births
Living people
Australian rugby league players
Australian rugby union players
Gold Coast Titans players
Melbourne Storm players
Queensland Reds players
Rugby league centres
Rugby league locks
Rugby league players from Taree
Rugby union players from Taree
Western Force players